Mohammadabad (also Romanized as Moḩammadābād and Muhammadābād; also known as Mohammadabad-e Katul (also Romanized as Moḩammadābād-e Katūl) is a village in Estarabad Rural District, Kamalan District, Aliabad County, Golestan Province, Iran. At the 2006 census, its population was 1,841, in 453 families.

References 

Populated places in Aliabad County